2020 in paleoentomology is a list of new fossil insect taxa that were described during the year 2020, as well as other significant discoveries and events related to paleoentomology that were scheduled to occur during the year.

New taxa

Coleopterans

Dictyopterans

Dipterans

Hemipterans

Hymenopterans

Mecopterans

Neuropterans

Odonatans

Orthopterans

Plecopterans

Trichopterans

Other insects

General research
 A new assemblage of nests produced by social insects is described from the Brushy Basin Member of the Upper Jurassic Morrison Formation (Utah, United States) by Smith, Loewen & Kirkland (2020), who name a new ichnotaxon Eopolis ekdalei.
 A study on the evolutionary history of the group Phasmatodea, as indicated by phylogenomic and fossil evidence, is published by Tihelka et al. (2020).
 A study on the phylogenetic relationships of the Cretaceous insect Umenocoleus is published by Beutel, Luo & Wipfler (2020).
 A study on the evolutionary history of dictyopterans, based on molecular and fossil data, is published by Condamine et al. (2020).
 Fossil oothecae produced by dictyopteran insects, representing the earliest fossil evidence of oothecae reported so far, are described from the Upper Triassic (Carnian) Potrerillos Formation (Argentina) by Cariglino, Lara & Zavattieri (2020), who name new ichnotaxa Oothecichnus pensilis and Oothecichnus duraznensis.
 Revision of the cicadomorph genera Ipsvicia and Ipsviciopsis from the Upper Triassic Blackstone Formation (Australia) is published by Lambkin (2020).
 100-million-year-old sweat bee nests, representing the oldest evidence of crown bees reported so far, are described from the Castillo Formation (Argentina) by Genise et al. (2020).
 A single worker of Ceratomyrmex ellenbergeri preserved restraining a Caputoraptor elegans nymph is described from the Cretaceous Burmese amber by Barden, Perrichot & Wang (2020), who argue that the aberrant morphology of fossil haidomyrmecine "hell ants" (scythe-like mouthparts and horn-like cephalic projections) was an adaptation for prey capture.
 Evidence of polymorphism within worker caste of ants belonging to the species Zigrasimecia ferox is presented by Cao et al. (2020).
 A study comparing the relative lengths of legs of ants from Baltic amber (Formica flori and members of the genus Cataglyphoides) and extant ants belonging to the genera Cataglyphis and Formica will be published by Wehner, Rabenstein & Habersetzer (2020), who report that the Cataglyphoides data are fully in accord with the Cataglyphis pattern of the leg-to-body length relationships, and discuss evolutionary implications of their findings.
 A snakefly larva with a very prominent, leg-sized antenna is described from the Cretaceous Burmese amber by Haug, Müller & Haug (2020), who discuss the implications of this specimen for the knowledge of the early evolution and diversification of snakeflies.
 Three neuropteran larvae with straight mandibulomaxillary stylets, representing some of the oldest straight-jawed neuropteran larvae reported so far, are described from the Aptian amber from Spain by Pérez-de la Fuente et al. (2020).
 New type of a lacewing larva, with a prominent forward projecting labrum and curved venom-injecting stylets formed by mandibles and maxillae, is described from the Cretaceous Burmese amber by Haug et al. (2020).
 Two pieces of Burmese amber, preserving several closely associated stylets of lacewing larvae (likely representing regurgitated remains previously consumed by an unknown predator) and a mite inserted with its anterior body into a lacewing larva and likely preying on it, are described by Hörnig et al. (2020).
 A study on the morphology and phylogenetic relationships of the mysteriomorphid beetles, based on data from new specimens from the Cretaceous Burmese amber, is published by Peris et al. (2020).
 Baranov et al. (2020) describe new records of Mesozoic and Cenozoic stratiomyomorphan fly larvae representing six discrete morphotypes, and evaluate the implications of these specimens for the knowledge of stratiomyomorphan ecomorphology and ecology throughout their evolutionary history.
 Evidence of the presence of diverse metallic colours in beetles, flies and hymenopterans from the Cretaceous Burmese amber is presented by Cai et al. (2020).

References

2020 in paleontology
Paleoentomology
2020-related lists